Tessa Ía González Norvind (born 3 April 1995), known as Tessa Ía, is a Mexican actress best known for her starring role in After Lucia. Through her mother she belongs to the Norwegian-Mexican Norvind family of actors.

Early life
Ía was born Tessa Ía González Norvind. Her father is lawyer Fernando González Parra and her mother is actress Nailea Norvind. She is the granddaughter of Norwegian-Mexican actress Eva Norvind, and through her she is of Finnish and Russian descent.

She is the younger half-sister of Camila Sodi through her father. She is also the sister of actress Naian Gonzalez Norvind.

Career

Acting
Ía made her film debut in the 2008 film The Burning Plain. In 2012 she starred in the film After Lucia about a teenage girl who is violently bullied by her classmates. For her role Ía was nominated for a Young Artist Award for Best Performance in an International Feature Film - Young Actress

In 2017 she appeared in a biopic of Mexican feminist Rosario Castellanos in The Eternal Feminine, playing the role of Rosario.

She also had a role in the 2018 TV series Narcos: Mexico which starred her former brother-in-law, Diego Luna.

Ía had the leading role in the TV series De brutas, nada in 2019 playing in Pantaya in the USA.

In 2020 Ía had the lead role in the TV series Unstoppable.

Singing
Ía released her debut album, Correspondencia, in 2016.

Musical Collaborations

References

External links

Living people
1995 births
21st-century Mexican actresses
Mexican film actresses
Mexican television actresses
Mexican people of Norwegian descent
Actresses from Mexico City
Mexican people of Finnish descent
Mexican people of Russian descent
Norvind family